is a Japanese professional boxer. He was a 2 times world title challenger.

Professional career
Mukai challenged Pongsaklek Wonjongkam with the WBC Flyweight title on the line on December 23, 2011, but the fight ended in a first round technical draw, so Wonjongkam retained the title.

Mukai holds wins over former world champion Sonny Boy Jaro who was the WBC, The Ring and Lineal Flyweight World Champion, as well as world title contender.

Mukai faced champion Srisaket Sor Rungvisai on November 15, 2013 with the WBC Super Flyweight title on the line, but lost when his corner threw in the towel in the ninth of twelve rounds.

In November 2016, Hirofumi Mukai defeated world title contender Tanawat Phonnaku to claim Tso’s vacated WBO Asia-Pacific Junior Bantamweight title.

On March 11, 2017, he lost the WBO Asia-Pacific title to Rex Tso.

Professional boxing record 

| style="text-align:center;" colspan="8"|13 Wins (3 knockout, 10 decisions), 5 Losses, 3 Draws
|-  style="text-align:center; background:#e3e3e3;"
|  style="border-style:none none solid solid; "|Res.
|  style="border-style:none none solid solid; "|Record
|  style="border-style:none none solid solid; "|Opponent
|  style="border-style:none none solid solid; "|Type
|  style="border-style:none none solid solid; "|Rd., Time
|  style="border-style:none none solid solid; "|Date
|  style="border-style:none none solid solid; "|Location
|  style="border-style:none none solid solid; "|Notes
|- align=center
|Loss
|13-5-3
|align=left| Rex Tso
|
|
|
|align=left|  
|align=left|
|- align=center
|- align=center
|Win
|13-4-3
|align=left| Tanawat Phonnaku
|
|
|
|align=left|
|align=left|
|- align=center
|- align=center
|Draw
|12-4-3
|align=left| Ryotaro Kawabata	
|
|
|
|align=left|
|align=left|
|- align=center
|- align=center
|Win
|12-4-2
|align=left| Toshikuni Wake
|
|
|
|align=left|
|align=left|
|- align=center
|- align=center
|Loss
|11-4-2
|align=left| Shohei Omori
|
|
|
|align=left|
|align=left|
|- align=center
|Win
|11-3-2
|align=left| Konosuke Tomiyama
|
|
|
|align=left|
|align=left|
|- align=center
|Win
|10-3-2
|align=left| Marjohn Yap
|
|
|
|align=left|
|align=left|
|- align=center
|Draw
|9-3-2
|align=left| Myung Ho Lee
|
|
|
|align=left|
|align=left|
|- align=center
|Loss
|9-3-1
|align=left| Srisaket Sor Rungvisai
|
|
|
|align=left|
|align=left|
|- align=center
|Win
|9-2-1
|align=left| Bum-Young Lee
|
|
|
|align=left|
|align=left|
|- align=center
|Loss
|8-2-1
|align=left| Mark Anthony Geraldo
|
|
|
|align=left|
|align=left|
|- align=center
|Win
|8-1-1
|align=left| Saenmuangloei Kokietgym
|
|
|
|align=left|
|align=left|
|- align=center
|Win
|7-1-1
|align=left| Witcharapol Kiatprapat
|
|
|
|align=left|
|align=left|
|- align=center
|Win
|6-1-1
|align=left| Khunkhiri Wor Wisaruth
|
|
|
|align=left|
|align=left|
|- align=center
|Draw
|5-1-1
|align=left| Pongsaklek Wonjongkam
|
|
|
|align=left|
|align=left|
|- align=center
|Loss
|5-1
|align=left| Rocky Fuentes
|
|
|
|align=left|
|align=left|
|- align=center
|Win
|5-0
|align=left| Sonny Boy Jaro
|
|
|
|align=left|
|align=left|
|- align=center
|Win
|4-0
|align=left| Anis Ceunfin
|
|
|
|align=left|
|align=left|
|- align=center
|Win
|3-0
|align=left| Jin-Man Jeon
|
|
|
|align=left|
|align=left|
|- align=center
|Win
|2-0
|align=left| Kenta Omae
|
|
|
|align=left|
|align=left|
|- align=center
|Win
|1-0
|align=left| Toru Uemura
|
|
|
|align=left|
|align=left|

References 

1985 births
Living people
Japanese male boxers
People from Hirakata
Sportspeople from Osaka Prefecture
Bantamweight boxers